Ven. Paltul Rinpoche (formerly known as Pora Rinpoche) is a Baram Kagyü lineage holder, one of the four major sub-schools of the Kagyü Order in Tibetan Buddhism. There are four major orders in Tibetan Buddhism in Tibet. The present Paltul Rinpoche is the fifth lineage holder of the previous four masters of Tibetan Healing Arts and Meditation. He also is the teacher and head of Demo Monastery (Pal Demo Tashi Choe-ling), located in the Nangchen region of Kham, Eastern Tibet. His Demo Monastery also incorporates a Traditional Institute of Medicine and Tibetan Astrology, as well as a hospital (under construction) for the local nomadic population.

Currently, Paltul Rinpoche lives and practices in New York City, and, besides many other projects, serves as the in-house religious consultant for Tibet House US.

Biography

Paltul Rinpoche was born into a nomadic family in Nangchen, Kham, Eastern Tibet. At an early age, he became intrigued by Buddha's teachings, and eventually joined the Lachen Monastery, a monastic institute of the Sakyapa Order (one of the four major schools of Tibetan Buddhism) located in the neighbourhood.

As a young man, Paltul Rinpoche decided to leave on pilgrimage. While in the middle of his journey, a fellow pilgrim led him the famous Palpung Retreat Centre founded by Jamgon Kongtrul Lodro Thaye Rinpoche, one of the masters in 19th-century Tibet. In this center Paltul Rinpoche met Ven. Yonten Phuntsok, an old and famous Tibetan medical doctor, who was himself a student of the even more famous Jamgon Kontrul Lodro Thaye Rinpoche. He was accepted as a personal student, and spent five years accomplishing the ancient Tibetan healing art.

After his apprenticeship, he returned to his hometown, got married and settled down. Unexpectedly, the region was visited by an entourage of the 12th Tai Situ Rinpoche looking for the reincarnation of the previous Pora Rinpoche of the Kagyü Order. According to the prophecy, Paltul Rinpoche was recognized as the reincarnation of Pora Rinpoche. The previous four Paltul Rinpoches were much renowned as meditation teachers and physicians all over Tibet. Coincidentally, the fourth Paltul Rinpoche had studied under and was a close disciple of Jamgon Kongtrul Lodro Thaye Rinpoche  at Palpung Retreat Center. After graduation, Jamgon Kongtrul Lodro Thaye Rinpoche had instructed the fourth Paltul Rinpoche to return home. Back home, Rinpoche established two retreat centres and spent the rest of his life teaching local people and outsiders from all over Tibet.

The 5th Paltul Rinpoche has received many profound teachings and empowerments from teachers such as the 17th Gyalwa Karmapa, Ogyen Trinley Dorje, H.H. Sakya Trizin, H.E. Thrangu Rinpoche, Palden Khentse Oser and Khenpo Tsultrim Gyatso. According to their advice and instruction, he is touring many Eastern and Western countries such as Germany, Switzerland, Poland, China, Singapur, Taiwan, and Malaysia to raise funds towards the construction projects by offering therapeutic services and meditation teachings to the people seeking the therapy of Tibetan medicine.

References

External links 
 Personal website

Barom Kagyu
Kagyu lamas
Rinpoches
Living people
Year of birth missing (living people)